K202 or K-202 may refer to:

K-202 (Kansas highway), a former state highway in Kansas
K-202, a 16-bit minicomputer